Ange-Louis Janet (26 November 1815 – 22 November 1872) also known under the pseudonym  Janet-Lange, was a French painter, illustrator, lithographer and engraver.

Biography 
Born in Paris, Janet was admitted in 1833 at the École des beaux-arts de Paris in the workshops of Ingres, Horace Vernet and Alexandre-Marie Colin. He made his debut at the Salon in 1836 and continued to participate until 1870. He painted hunting scenes, military costumes and portraits and composed paintings retracing episodes of French history, such as the Crimean War from 1853 to 1856, the Second Italian War of Independence (1859) and the Second French intervention in Mexico from 1861 to 1867.

He also did some book illustration, including for the French edition of G. A. Henty's The Young Franc-Tireurs (1873), Librairie Hachette, Paris. Henty like the illustrations so much that he got electros from the wood blocks and used them to illustrate the story when it was serialised in Union Jack in preference to the illustrations for the English edition.

Janet died in Paris on 22 November 1872 at the age of 61.

References

Bibliography 
 David Karel, Dictionnaire des artistes de langue française en Amérique du Nord: peintres, sculpteurs, dessinateurs, graveurs, photographes, et orfèvres, Presses Université Laval, 1992,  (on line books.google.com).

External links 
 Ange-Louis Janet
 L’amazone, Portrait de Madame de C…

19th-century French painters
19th-century French illustrators
19th-century French engravers
19th-century French lithographers
19th-century French male artists
École des Beaux-Arts alumni
1815 births
Painters from Paris
1872 deaths
French children's book illustrators
Magazine illustrators